Hatyai Hospital is a hospital in Hat Yai, Songkhla Province, Thailand. It is classified as a regional hospital under the Ministry of Public Health, and it is one of two main hospitals operated by the MOPH in the province, the other being Songkhla Hospital. It serves as a referral centre for nearby community hospitals mainly within Songkhla, but also in parts of Pattani and Satun Provinces. It nominally has a capacity of 640 beds, but as is often the case with most regional hospitals, faces problems of overcrowding and is over-capacity most of the time.

The hospital was founded in 1957 and has gradually expanded since then. Currently it also serves as a teaching hospital for the Faculty of Medicine, Prince of Songkhla University under the Collaborative Project to Increase Production of Rural Doctors (CPIRD), and is certified for residency training in internal medicine, obstetrics & gynaecology, orthopaedics, paediatrics and surgery.

See also 
 Hospitals in Thailand
 List of hospitals in Thailand

References
 .

External links
 Hatyai Hospital official website

Hospital buildings completed in 1957
Hospitals in Thailand
Hospitals established in 1957
Buildings and structures in Songkhla province
1957 establishments in Thailand